Jesse Walworth Thayer Orndorff  (January 15, 1881 – September 28, 1960) was a Major League Baseball catcher. He played parts of nine seasons in the minor leagues from 1904 to 1917. 

Orndorff wrote a booklet called "The Fundamentals of How to Play Baseball" in 1936 when he was head instructor of the National Baseball School in Los Angeles, California.

References

External links 

1881 births
1960 deaths
Boston Doves players
Major League Baseball catchers
Baseball players from Illinois
Minor league baseball managers
Galveston Sand Crabs players
Leavenworth Orioles players
Bloomington Bloomers players
Los Angeles Angels (minor league) players
Peoria Distillers players
Louisville Colonels (minor league) players
Milwaukee Brewers (minor league) players
Sioux City Packers players
San Francisco Seals (baseball) players